The Sonata in G major (HWV 358) was composed (c. 1707-10) by George Frideric Handel, for an unspecified instrument and keyboard (harpsichord). The work is also referred to as HHA iv/18,3. (There is no HG designation for the work.)

For an unknown reason, Handel did not indicate the instrumentation or the tempo markings on the movements. In fact, the original manuscript does not even mention that it is a "sonata". The tessitura is high for a violin, and the work does not fall below G4 (which is a whole octave above the violin's lowest note). For this reason (although the violin is the most likely instrument), the recorder is sometimes used for performance.

The work is referred to as one of the Fitzwilliam sonatas.

A typical performance of the work takes almost five minutes.

Movements
The work consists of three movements:

Note that the tempo for each movement was not marked on the score, and the above are by general agreement by subsequent publishers.

See also
List of solo sonatas by George Frideric Handel

References

Violin sonatas by George Frideric Handel
Recorder sonatas by George Frideric Handel
1710 compositions
Compositions in G major